Daniel Duarte (born 25 October 1979) is a Gibraltarian former footballer who mostly played for Gibraltar Premier Division side Lincoln Red Imps, as well as the Gibraltar national team, where he played as a central midfielder. With 46 titles with Lincoln Red Imps, he is one of the most decorated footballers in association football history.

International career
Duarte made his international debut with Gibraltar on 19 November 2013 in a 0–0 home draw with Slovakia. This was Gibraltar's first game since being admitted to UEFA

International career statistics

Honours
Lincoln Red Imps
Gibraltar Premier Division (14): 2000–01, 2002–03, 2003–04, 2004–05, 2005–06, 2006–07, 2007–08, 2008–09, 2009–10, 2010–11, 2011–12, 2012–13, 2013–14, 2014–15
Rock Cup (11): 2001–02, 2003–04, 2004–05, 2005–06, 2006–07, 2007–08, 2008–09, 2009–10, 2010–11, 2014, 2015
Pepe Reyes Cup (10): 2001, 2002, 2004, 2007, 2008, 2009, 2010, 2011, 2014, 2015
Gibraltar League Senior Cup (11): 1999–2000, 2001–02, 2002–03, 2003–04, 2004–05, 2005–06, 2006–07, 2007–08, 2010–11, 2011–12, 2013–14

References

External links
 
 
 

1979 births
Living people
Gibraltarian footballers
Gibraltar international footballers
Association football midfielders
Lincoln Red Imps F.C. players
Manchester 62 F.C. players
Gibraltar Premier Division players